Rhopalosilpha wasmanni is a species of beetle in the family Dermestidae, the only species in the genus Rhopalosilpha.

References

Dermestidae